Sir Ian Trevelyan Chapman  is a British physicist who is the chief executive of the United Kingdom Atomic Energy Authority (UKAEA).

Education 
Chapman went to school at Elizabeth College, Guernsey. He graduated from Durham University (Hild Bede College) with an M.Sci. in Mathematics and Physics in 2004. Chapman then joined UKAEA's Culham laboratory as a plasma physics PhD student with Imperial College London. His research focused on understanding and controlling instabilities in the plasma fuel within tokamak fusion devices. He received his PhD in 2008.

Career 
Chapman continued his plasma physics research at Culham and progressed through a number of positions in the UK fusion programme, including Head of Tokamak Science in 2014 and Fusion Programme Manager in 2015. In October 2016 he became UKAEA's Chief Executive Officer, succeeding Sir Steven Cowley.

He has published over 110 journal papers and given 30 invited lead-author presentations at international conferences. In 2015, he became a visiting professor at Durham University.

International roles 
Chapman has held a number of international roles in fusion research. He was a Task Force Leader for the Joint European Torus fusion device from 2012 to 2014. He was appointed a member of the programme advisory committee for US experiment NSTX-U in 2013. He has chaired international working groups for the international fusion project ITER and led work packages within the EU fusion programme.

Awards and honours 
Chapman's research has been recognised with a number of notable awards, including:

 SET For Britain Best Early Career Physicist (2011)
 International Union of Pure and Applied Physics Young Scientist Prize (2012)
 Fellowship of Institute of Physics (2013)
 Institute of Physics Clifford Paterson Medal and Prize (2013)
 European Physical Society Early Career Prize (2014)
 Fellow of the Royal Academy of Engineering (2022)

Chapman was knighted in the 2023 New Year Honours for services to global fusion energy.

References

Living people
Year of birth missing (living people)
British chief executives
Academics of Durham University
Fellows of the Royal Academy of Engineering
Knights Bachelor
British physicists
People educated at Elizabeth College, Guernsey
Alumni of the College of St Hild and St Bede, Durham